Péter Bajzát (born 22 June 1981) is a Hungarian former professional footballer who played as a forward.

Honours
Debreceni VSC
 Hungarian Cup: 1999, 2001

Győr
 Nemzeti Bajnokság I: 2007, 2010
 Hungarian Cup: runner up 2009

Individual
 Player of the Year in Hungary: 2008
 Hungarian National Championship I top goalscorer: 2006–07 with 18 goals, 2008–09 with 20 goals
 Hungarian National Championship II top goalscorer: 2010–11 with 25 goals, 2013–14 with 25 goals

External links 
footmercato.net
eto.hu
uefa.com
hlsz.hu

1981 births
Living people
Sportspeople from Eger
Hungarian footballers
Association football forwards
Nemzeti Bajnokság I players
Nemzeti Bajnokság II players
2. Bundesliga players
Egri FC players
Debreceni VSC players
Rot-Weiß Oberhausen players
Győri ETO FC players
Diósgyőri VTK players
Nyíregyháza Spartacus FC players
Pécsi MFC players
Hungarian expatriate footballers
Expatriate footballers in Germany
Hungarian expatriate sportspeople in Germany